John Robert Stefero (born September 22, 1959 in Sumter, South Carolina) is a former Major League Baseball catcher. His listed height is 5'8" tall, and attended Motlow State Community College in Tullahoma, Tennessee.

John Stefero's major league career included just 79 games in three seasons. The catcher hit three home runs in his career and drove in a total of 20 runs.

Stefero helped to cap an Oriole comeback on September 18, 1983. Eddie Murray hit a grand slam off Pete Ladd in a six-run eighth inning. The Orioles had been trailing 7-0. The Orioles won the game when Stefero connected on a single in the ninth inning.

Stefero has worked at Brown's Automotive Group in Glen Burnie, Maryland since his retirement as an active player in 1990. He is currently its President/General Manager.

References

Sources

1959 births
Living people
American expatriate baseball players in Canada
Baltimore Orioles players
Baseball players from South Carolina
Bluefield Orioles players
Charlotte Knights players
Charlotte O's players
Colorado Springs Sky Sox players
Hagerstown Suns players
Indianapolis Indians players
Major League Baseball catchers
Montreal Expos players
Miami Orioles players
People from Glen Burnie, Maryland
Rochester Red Wings players
Sportspeople from Sumter, South Carolina
Motlow State Bucks baseball players